Émile Desportes (1878, Pont l'Evêque, France1944, Méricourt) was a French composer and conductor. He was the father of composer Yvonne Desportes (1907–93).

Desportes was originally a lawyer at Caen, then professor of music and conductor. He studied composition with Paul Dukas, but soon became more interested in other activities.

Most of his compositions were written for wind instruments, but he also wrote songs, and his best known piece is Pastorale joyeuse for flute and guitar.

References

20th-century classical composers
1878 births
1944 deaths
20th-century French composers
French classical composers
French male classical composers
20th-century French male musicians